Austrian and American actor, film producer, businessman, retired professional bodybuilder and politician Arnold Schwarzenegger has appeared in over 40 films, and has also ventured into directing and producing. He began his acting career primarily with small roles in film and television starting in 1969. For his first film role, he was credited as "Arnold Strong", but was credited with his birth name thereafter. He has appeared mainly in action and comedy films. In addition to films and television, he has appeared in music videos for AC/DC, Bon Jovi, and Guns N' Roses.

In the 1980s, Schwarzenegger became his primary character in two film franchises: as Conan in the Conan series and as The Terminator in the Terminator series. His other film roles include Commando, The Running Man, Predator, Total Recall, Last Action Hero and True Lies. Although Schwarzenegger's acting career was put on hiatus due to his position as Governor of California, he also made several cameos in various films while in office, including The Kid & I and The Expendables. On February 11, 2011, just over a month after leaving office, Schwarzenegger announced he would return to acting.

Schwarzenegger has received several awards and nominations for his work in films. In Stay Hungry, one of his early roles, he won a Golden Globe Award for Best Acting Debut in a Motion Picture. He has also been nominated for various awards for his roles in Terminator 2: Judgment Day, Junior, and True Lies. According to Box Office Mojo, a box office revenue tracking website, films in which Schwarzenegger has acted have grossed a total of more than $1.7 billion within the United States, with an average of $67 million per film and total $4.0 billion worldwide. According to The Numbers, another box office revenue tracking website, films in which Schwarzenegger has acted have total grossed around $4.5 billion worldwide.

Film

Television

Commercials 
{| class="wikitable plainrowheaders sortable" style="margin-right: 0;"
|-
! scope="col" | Year
! scope="col" | Title
! scope="col" | Role
! scope="col" class="unsortable" | Notes
! scope="col" class="unsortable" | 
|-
! scope=row| 1990
| ''Nissin Cup Noodle: Arnold Schwarzenegger 'Noodle Man| Himself
|
|
|-
! scope=row| 1991
| Nissin Cup Noodle: Arnold Schwarzenegger
| Himself
|
|
|-
! scope=row| 2014
| Bud Light: Ian Up for Whatever
| Arnold
|
|
|-
! scope=row| 2015
| WWE 2K16 - Arnold Schwarzenegger Terminator Commercial
| The Terminator
|
|
|-
! scope=row| 2022
| BMW: Zeus & Hera
| Thunder Zeus
|
|
|}

 Music videos 

 Soundtrack appearances 

 Video games 

 See also 
 List of awards and nominations received by Arnold Schwarzenegger

 References General sources'''

External links 
 

Filmography
Schwarzenegger filmography
Director filmographies
American filmographies